Hayley Emma Raso (born 5 September 1994) is an Australian soccer player, who plays as a winger for Women's Super League club Manchester City and the Australian national team. 

Raso began her senior career with Canberra United in 2011, and was part of the side that won the 2011–12 W-League. Since then, she had played for various clubs in the W-League and the NWSL before playing in the Women's Super League. She joined Manchester City after she was released by Everton on 17 August 2021. 

Raso has played on the Australian women's national soccer team, the Matildas, since 2012 and had represented the national team in the 2019 FIFA Women's World Cup and the 2020 Summer Olympics. She previously played for the under-20 national team, the Young Matildas.

Club career

Canberra United
Raso was invited to train with the Queensland Academy of Sport, but this did not result in her being awarded a scholarship. Instead, after a successful trial, Raso signed for Canberra United during the 2011–12 W-League season. She made seven league appearances for Canberra that season, and was part of the squad that won the W-League following a victory over Brisbane Roar in the grand final.

Raso remained with Canberra for the 2012–13 season, and scored her first senior goal in a 5–0 victory over Newcastle Jets on 27 October 2012. She played for Canberra in the International Women's Club Championship, but despite scoring the second goal of her career, she was unable to prevent her team from losing 4–3 to NTV Beleza in the third-place playoff. Raso ended the season having scored four goals in ten league games for Canberra.

Brisbane Roar
Prior to the start of the 2013–14 season, Raso opted to return to Brisbane, and joined Brisbane Roar FC. She made her debut for her new club against Canberra on 9 November, but was unable to prevent Brisbane from losing 3–0. On 1 December 2013, she scored her first goal for Brisbane in a 4–1 victory over Western Sydney Wanderers FC.

Washington Spirit
In June 2015, Raso was signed to the Washington Spirit of the National Women's Soccer League (NWSL) upon the conclusion of the 2015 FIFA Women's World Cup in Canada. She came on in the 73rd minute in her Spirit debut on 18 July 2015 against the Seattle Reign FC, helping preserve a 3–0 victory. She was waived by the Spirit in April 2016.

Portland Thorns FC

Shortly after being waived by the Spirit, Raso was acquired off waivers by the Portland Thorns FC. In the Thorns first four games of the 2016 season, Raso came on as a second half sub in each. She became a regular starter during the 2017 season due to a long-term injury to Tobin Heath, and scored her first NWSL goal on 28 June 2017. After which she scored five more goals in the regular season, and one in the playoffs to help the Thorns win the 2017 NWSL Championship. She was named 2017 MVP by the Rose City Riveters.

After suffering a partial tear to her lateral collateral ligament during the 2018 AFC Women's Asian Cup, she missed the first 11 games of the 2018 NWSL season. She made her season debut on 16 June and went on to play in 12 games, scoring 2 goals.

Back injury 
On 25 August 2018 Raso while playing for Portland, Raso fractured 3 vertebrae in her back due to an on field collision. The injury, caused by a knee to the back, left Raso unsure if she would walk again. After extensive rehabilitation, Raso returned 6 months after the injury at the 2019 Cup of Nations where she scored in her return match against New Zealand.

Canberra United (loan) 
On 10 October 2016, it was announced Raso would be loaned to Canberra United for the 2016–17 W-League season.

Brisbane Roar (loan) 
On 21 September 2017, Raso signed a loan with Brisbane Roar FC for the 2017–18 W-League season.  After recovering from a back injury sustained in the 2018 Portland Thorns season, Raso signed another loan agreement with the Roar for the 2018–19 W-League.  She made 4 appearances and scored 1 goal.

Everton 
In January 2020 Raso was transferred to Everton in the FA Women's Super League. She would join and be free to play for them from mid February, following an international break.  She was released as a free agent by Everton on 17 August 2021.

Manchester City 
On 18 August 2021, Raso signed a two-year contract with Manchester City. On 31 August, Raso made her Manchester City debut as a second-half substitute in a 1–1 draw with Real Madrid in the UEFA Women's Champions League.

International career
In June 2012, Raso was called up to the Australian senior squad for the first time. She made her debut on 24 June, in a 1–1 draw with New Zealand. She was part of the Australian under-20 side at the 2013 AFF Women's Championship, and was part of the side that finished runner-up to Japan's under-23 side. Following this, she returned to the senior side for the matches against China, and played in the match held on 24 November.

Raso was a member of the Matildas Tokyo 2020 Olympics squad. The Matildas qualified for the quarter-finals and beat Great Britain before being eliminated in the semi-final with Sweden. In the playoff for the Bronze medal they were beaten by the USA.

Off the pitch 
In 2021, Raso co-authored a children book, Hayley's Ribbon, based on her own early childhood experience.

Career statistics

Club

International 

Scores and results list Australia's goal tally first, score column indicates score after each Raso goal.

Honours

Club
Brisbane Roar Football Club
 W-League Premiership: 2017–18

Canberra United
 W-League Championship: 2011–12
 W-League Premiership: 2011–12, 2016–17

Portland Thorns
 NWSL Championship: 2017
 NWSL Shield: 2016
 Rose City Riveters Most Valuable Player: 2017

Manchester City
Women's League Cup: 2021–22

International
Australia
 Tournament of Nations: 2017
 FFA Cup of Nations: 2019

See also
 List of Australia women's international soccer players
 List of foreign FA Women's Super League players
 List of Portland Thorns FC players
 List of Washington Spirit players
 List of Italian Australians

References

Further reading 
 Grainey, Timothy (2012), Beyond Bend It Like Beckham: The Global Phenomenon of Women's Soccer, University of Nebraska Press, 
 Oxenham, Gwendolyn (2017), Under the Lights and In the Dark: Untold Stories of Women's Soccer, Icon Books Limited 
 Stay, Shane (2019), The Women's World Cup 2019 Book: Everything You Need to Know About the Soccer World Cup, Books on Demand, 
 Theivam, Keiran and Jeff Kassouf (2019), The Making of the Women's World Cup: Defining stories from a sport's coming of age, Little, 
 Various (2019), Stand Up for the Future, Penguin Random House, 
 Williams, Jean (2007), A Beautiful Game: International Perspectives on Women's Football , A&C Black, 
 Williams, Lydia (2019), Saved!, Allen & Unwin,

External links

 
 National Women's Soccer League player profile
 Portland Thorns FC player profile
 Washington Spirit player profile 
 
 

Australian women's soccer players
1994 births
Living people
Canberra United FC players
Brisbane Roar FC (A-League Women) players
Washington Spirit players
Melbourne Victory FC (A-League Women) players
2015 FIFA Women's World Cup players
Soccer players from Brisbane
Australia women's international soccer players
Women's association football midfielders
Women's association football forwards
Portland Thorns FC players
A-League Women players
Everton F.C. (women) players
Manchester City W.F.C. players
National Women's Soccer League players
Australian expatriate sportspeople in the United States
Expatriate women's soccer players in the United States
Australian expatriate sportspeople in England
Expatriate women's footballers in England
2019 FIFA Women's World Cup players
Footballers at the 2020 Summer Olympics
Olympic soccer players of Australia
Australian expatriate women's soccer players
Sportswomen from Queensland